John Stiray was a South African sports shooter. He competed in the 600 m free rifle event at the 1924 Summer Olympics.

References

External links
 

Year of birth missing
Year of death missing
South African male sport shooters
Olympic shooters of South Africa
Shooters at the 1924 Summer Olympics
Place of birth missing
20th-century South African people